Pyrausta contristalis is a moth in the family Crambidae. It was described by Aristide Caradja in 1932. It is found in Sichuan, China.

References

Moths described in 1932
contristalis
Moths of Asia